Tõnis Erm (born 18 January 1982 in Tallinn) is an Estonian mountain bike orienteer. At the 2008 World MTB Orienteering Championships in Ostróda, he won a bronze medal in the sprint event. In Ben Shemen in 2009 he won a silver medal in the sprint.

References

1982 births
Living people
Estonian orienteers
Male orienteers
Estonian male cyclists
Mountain bike orienteers
Sportspeople from Tallinn